Sibelis Veranes Morell (born February 5, 1974) is a Cuban judoka. At the 2000 Summer Olympics she won the gold medal in the women's Middleweight (63–70 kg) category.

References

External links
 
 
 radiorebelde

1974 births
Living people
Judoka at the 2000 Summer Olympics
Judoka at the 1999 Pan American Games
Olympic judoka of Cuba
Olympic gold medalists for Cuba
Olympic medalists in judo
Cuban female judoka
Medalists at the 2000 Summer Olympics
Pan American Games gold medalists for Cuba
Pan American Games medalists in judo
Medalists at the 1999 Pan American Games
20th-century Cuban women
21st-century Cuban women